Burlington Municipal Airport  is a public use airport located  northwest of the central business district of Burlington, a city in Racine County, Wisconsin, United States.

It is included in the Federal Aviation Administration (FAA) National Plan of Integrated Airport Systems for 2021–2025, in which it is categorized as a local general aviation facility.

Although most U.S. airports use the same three-letter location identifier for the FAA and IATA, this airport is assigned BUU by the FAA but has no designation from IATA.

The airport does not have scheduled airline service.

Facilities and aircraft 
It has two runways: 11/29 is 4,300 by 75 feet (1,311 x 23 m) with an asphalt surface; 1/19 is 2,410 by 130 feet (735 x 40 m) with a turf surface.

The airport has approved GPS and VOR instrument approaches.

For the 12-month period ending May 5, 2021, the airport had 54,900 aircraft operations, an average of 150 per day: 98% general aviation, 1% military and 1% air taxi.
In January 2023, there were 49 aircraft based at this airport:  40 single-engine, 5 multi-engine and 4 jet.

See also
List of airports in Wisconsin

References

External links 
Burlington Municipal at Wisconsin DOT Airport Directory
 

Airports in Wisconsin
Buildings and structures in Racine County, Wisconsin
Airports in Racine County, Wisconsin